This is a list of Danish painters who were born in or whose creative production is associated with Denmark:

A

 Axel Aabrink (1887–1965)
 Jørgen Aabye (1868–1959) 
 Carl Frederik Aagaard (1833–1895)
 Nikolaj Abraham Abildgaard (1744–1809)
 Georg Achen (1860–1912)
 Else Alfelt (1910–1974)
 Peder Als (1725–1776)
 Peter Alsing Nielsen (1907–1985)
 Catherine Engelhart Amyot (1845–1926) 
 Anna Ancher (1859–1935)
 Michael Ancher (1849–1927)
 Morten Andersen (born 1976)

B

 Carl Baagøe (1829-1902)
 Otto Bache (1839–1927)
 Carl Balsgaard (1812–1893)
 Emil Bærentzen (1799–1868)
 Mogens Ballin (1871–1914)
 Magdalene Bärens (1737–1808)
 Poul Anker Bech (1942–2009)
 Wilhelm Bendz (1804–1832)
 Albert Bertelsen (1921–2019)
 Ejler Bille (1910–2004)
 Jens Birkholm (1869–1915)
 Wilhelm Bissen (1836–1913)
 Carl Heinrich Bloch (1834–1890)
 Lars Bo (1924–1999)
 Jørgen Boberg (1940–2009)
 Peter Brandes (born 1944)
 Hans Andersen Brendekilde (1857–1942)
 Victor Brockdorff (1911–1992)
 Laura Brun-Pedersen (1883–1961)
 Johan Jacob Bruun (1715–1789)
 Eva Louise Buus (born 1979)

C

 Emil Carlsen (1853–1932)
 Andreas Riis Carstensen (1844–1906)
 Ebba Carstensen (1885–1967)
 Johannes Carstensen (1924–2010)
 C.C.A. Christensen (1831–1912)
 Godfred Christensen (1845–1928)
 Poul Simon Christiansen (1855–1933)

 Franciska Clausen (1899–1986)
 Gad Frederik Clement (1867–1933)
 Janus la Cour (1837–1909)

D

 Carl Dahl (1812–1865)
 Christen Dalsgaard (1824–1907)
 Sven Dalsgaard (1914–1999)
 Inger Lut Debois (1931–2015), painter
 Heinrich Dohm (1875–1940)
 Anton Dorph (1831–1914)
 Bertha Dorph (1875–1960)
 Dankvart Dreyer (1816–1852)

E

 Christoffer Wilhelm Eckersberg (1783–1853)
 Heinrich Eddelien (1802–1852)
 Eiler Rasmussen Eilersen (1827–1912)
 Ib Eisner (1925–2003)
 Harald Rudyard Engman (1903–1968)
 Julius Exner (1825–1910)

F

 Paul Gustave Fisher (1860–1934)
 Elna Fonnesbech-Sandberg (1892–1994)
 Johanna Marie Fosie (1726–1764)
 Wilhelm Freddie (1909–1995)

 Didrik Frisch (1836–1867)
 Cladius Detlev Fritzsch (1765–1841)
 Lorenz Frølich (1820–1908)
 Georg Mathias Fuchs (1719–1797)

G

 Paul Gadegaard (1920–1996)
 Johan Vilhelm Gertner (1818–1871)
 Ib Geertsen (1919–2009) 
 Emily Gernild (born 1985) 
 Albert Gottschalk (1866–1906)
 Vilhelm Groth (1842–1899)

H

 Erik Hagens (born 1940)
 Hans Jørgen Hammer (1815–1882)
 Svend Hammershøi (1873–1948)
 Vilhelm Hammershøi (1864–1916)
 Constantin Hansen (1804–1880)
 Hans Hansen (1769–1828)
 Heinrich Hansen (painter) (1821–1890)

 Peter Hansen (1868–1928)
 Otto Haslund (1842–1917)
 Arne Haugen Sørensen (born 1932)
 Sven Havsteen-Mikkelsen (1912–1999)
 Henry Heerup (1907–1993)
 Ella Heide (1871–1956)
 Einar Hein (1875–1931)
 Hanne Hellesen (1801–1844)
 Erik Henningsen (1855–1930)
 Frants Henningsen (1850–1908)
Marie Henriques (1866–1944)
 Sally Henriques (1815–1886)
 Carsten Henrichsen (1824–1897)
 Søren Hjorth Nielsen (1901–1983)
 Niels Peter Holbech (1804–1889)
 Johannes Holbek (1872–1903)
 Christian Holm (1804–1846)
 Heinrich Gustav Ferdinand Holm (1803–1861)
 Paul Høm (1905–1994)
 Christian Horneman (1765–1844)
 Johannes Holt-Iversen (born 1989)
Sophie Holten (1858–1930), painter
 Suzette Holten (1863–1937), painter, ceramist
 Oluf Høst (1884–1966)
 Bizzie Høyer (1888–1971)
 Cornelius Høyer (1741–1804)
 Knud Hvidberg (1927–1986)
 Ejnar Hansen (painter) (1884–1965)

I

 Peter Ilsted (1861–1933)
 Valdemar Irminger (1850–1938)
 Victor Isbrand (1897–1989)

J

 Egill Jacobsen (1910–1998)
 Georg Jacobsen (1887–1976)
 Robert Jacobsen (1912–1993)
 Ville Jais-Nielsen (1885–1949) 

 Axel P. Jensen (1885–1972) 

 Christian Albrecht Jensen (1792–1870)
 Johan Laurentz Jensen (1800–1856)
 Karl Jensen (1851–1933)
 Elisabeth Jerichau-Baumann (1819–1881)
 Harald Jerichau (1851–1878)
 August Jerndorff (1846–1906)
 Carl Ludwig Jessen (1833–1917)
 Svend Johansen (1890–1970)
 Asger Jorn (1914–1973)
 Jens Juel (1745–1802)

K

 Ludvig Kabell (1853–1902)

 F.C. Kiærskou (1805–1891)
 Anton Eduard Kieldrup (1826–1869)
 Helvig Kinch (1872–1956)
 Per Kirkeby (1938–2018)
 Kirsten Kjær (1893–1985)
 Anna Klindt Sørensen (1899–1985)
 Jesper Knudsen (born 1964)
 Christen Købke (1810–1848)
 Elise Konstantin-Hansen (1858–1946)
 John Kørner (born 1967)

 Hendrick Krock (1671–1738)
 Christian Krogh (1852–1925)
 Pietro Krohn (1840–1905) 
 Marie Krøyer (1867–1940)
 Peder Severin Krøyer (1851–1909)
 Albert Küchler (1803–1886)
 Michael Kvium (born 1955)
 Vilhelm Kyhn (1819–1903)

L

 Alhed Larsen (1872–1927)
 Emanuel Larsen (1823–1859)
 Johannes Larsen (1867–1961)
 Freddie A. Lerche (born 1937)
 Harald Leth (1899–1986)
 Georg Emil Libert (1820–1908)
 Christian August Lorentzen (1746–1828)
 Christine Løvmand (1803–1872)
 Jens Lund (1871–1924)
 J. L. Lund (1777–1867)
 Johan Thomas Lundbye (1818–1848)
 Anders Christian Lunde (1809–1886)
 Marie Luplau (1848–1925)
 Anne Marie Lütken (1916–2001)
 Julie Lütken (1788–1816)

M

 Niels Macholm (1915–1997)
 Ernst Mahler (1797–1861)
 Lise Malinovsky (born 1957)
 Sonja Ferlov Mancoba (1911–1984)
 Wilhelm Marstrand (1810–1873)
 Anton Melbye (1818–1875)
 Fritz Melbye (1826–1869)
 Vilhelm Melbye (1824–1882)
 Albert Mertz (1920–1990)
 Ernst Meyer (1797–1861)
 Jens Peter Møller (1783–1854)
 Mogens Møller (1934–2021)
 Valdemar Schønheyder Møller (1864–1905)
 David Monies (1812–1894)
 Christian Mølsted (1862–1930)
 Peder Mørk Mønsted (1859–1941)
 Richard Mortensen (1910–1993)
 Adam August Müller (1811–1844)
 Emilie Mundt (1842–1922)

N

Elisabeth Neckelmann (1884–1956)
 Hermania Neergaard (1799–1875)
 Rasmus Nellemann (1923–2004)
 Arthur Nielsen (1883–1946)
 Ejnar Nielsen (1872–1956)
 Jais Nielsen (1885–1961)
 Thorvald Niss (1842–1905)

 Emil Normann (1798–1881)
Ernestine Nyrop (1888–1975)

O

 Henrik Olrik (1830–1890)
 John Olsen (born 1938)
 Erik Ortvad (1917–2008)
 Ovartaci (1894 – 1985)

P

 Vilhelm Pacht (1843–1912)
 Erik Pauelsen (1749–1790)
 Julius Paulsen (1860–1940)
 Carl-Henning Pedersen (1913–2007)
Sophie Pedersen (1885–1850)

 Vilhelm Pedersen (1820–1859)
 Anna Petersen (1845–1910)
 Edvard Petersen (1841–1911)
 Leif Sylvester Petersen (born 1940)
 Vilhelm Petersen (1812–1880)
 Fritz Petzholdt (1805–1838)
 Theodor Philipsen (1840–1920)
 Camille Pissarro (1830–1903)
 Gudrun Poulsen (1918–1999)
 Bolette Puggaard (1798–1847)

R

 Pia Ranslet (born 1956)
 Tal R (born 1967)
 Erik Raadal (1905–1941)
 Johannes Rach (1720–1783)

 Carl Rasmussen (1841–1893)
 Louise Ravn-Hansen (1849–1909)
 Jytte Rex (born 1942)
 L.A. Ring (1854–1933)
 Elof Risebye (1892–1961)
 Jørgen Roed (1808–1888)
 Johan Rohde (1856–1935)
 Martinus Rørbye (1803–1848)
 Vilhelm Rosenstand (1838–1915)
 Godtfred Rump (1816–1880)

S

 August Schiøtt (1823–1895)
 Alfred Schmidt (1858–1938)
 Ludvig Abelin Schou (1838–1867)
 Peter Alfred Schou (1844–1914)
 Ole Schwalbe (1929–1990)
 Carl Christian Seydewitz (1777–1857)
 Herman Siegumfeldt (1833–1912)
 Alfred Simonsen (1906–1935)
 Niels Simonsen (1807–1885)
 Joakim Skovgaard (1856–1933)
 Niels Skovgaard (1858–1938) 
 P.C. Skovgaard (1817–1875)
 Agnes Slott-Møller (1862–1937)
 Harald Slott-Møller (1864–1937)
 Frederik Sødring (1809–1862)
 Jens Søndergaard (1895–1957)
 Jørgen Sonne (1801–1890)
 Carl Frederik Sørensen (1818–1879)
 Ole Sporring (born 1941)
 Niels Larsen Stevns (1864–1941)
 Christine Swane (1876–1960)
 Sigurd Swane (1879–1973)
 Anna Syberg (1870–1914)
 Ernst Syberg (1906–1981)
 Fritz Syberg (1862–1939)

T

 Carl Thomsen (1847–1912)
 Reinhold Timm (?–1639)
 Peter Tom-Petersen (1861–1926)
 Kurt Trampedach (1943–2013)
Eleonora Tscherning (1817–1890)
 Laurits Tuxen (1853–1927)
 Nicoline Tuxen (1853–1927)

V

 Herman Vedel (1875–1948)

W

 Olga Wagner (1873–1963)
 Bertha Wegmann (1847–1926)
 Edvard Weie (1879–1943)
 Friedrich Bernhard Westphal (1803–1844)
 Johannes Wilhjelm (1868–1938) 
 Jens Ferdinand Willumsen (1863–1958)
 Svend Wiig Hansen (1922–1997)
 Bjørn Wiinblad (1918–2006)
 Abraham Wuchters (1608–1682)

Z

 Christian Zacho (1843–1913)
 Kristian Zahrtmann (1843–1917)
 Johann Georg Ziesenis (1716–1777)

See also
 Danish art
 List of Danes
 List of lists of painters by nationality

References

 
Painters
Danish